Ruth Hale may refer to:

 Ruth Hale (feminist) (1887–1934), American feminist
 Ruth Hale (alpinist) (1900-1937)
 Ruth Hale (playwright and actress) (1908–2003), American playwright and actress